Erwin Jollasse (12 December 1892 – 8 March 1987) was a general in the Wehrmacht of Nazi Germany during World War II who commanded several divisions. He was a recipient of the Knight's Cross of the Iron Cross.

Jollasse took command of the 9th Panzer Division on 22 July 1943 and held it until he was wounded in October, he later resumed command in November and held it until 10 August 1944, when he was wounded again. In late 1944 he was declared fit for limited service and was given a desk job at the Inspectorate of Panzer Troops. In March 1945 he was named to replace Maj. Gen Rudolf Goltzsch as commander of the 344. Volksgrenadier Division in Czechoslovakia, a command he held until 30 April 1945, when he and twenty-five other men broke out of the Soviet encirclement and eluded the Red and US Armies until 8 June. He was released from prison on 30 June 1947 and died on 14 March 1987 in Tutzing.

Decorations

 Knight's Cross of the Iron Cross on 2 November 1941 as Oberst and commander of Schützen-Regiment 52

References

Citations

Bibliography

 Mitcham, Samuel W. Jr. 2008."Panzer Commanders of the Western Front:German Tank Generals in WWII". Mechanicsburg PA, USA.StackPole Books. .

1892 births
1987 deaths
German Army personnel of World War I
German prisoners of war in World War II held by the United States
Lieutenant generals of the German Army (Wehrmacht)
Military personnel from Hamburg
Recipients of the clasp to the Iron Cross, 1st class
Recipients of the Gold German Cross
Recipients of the Knight's Cross of the Iron Cross